This article lists events that occurred during 1993 in the Federal Republic of Yugoslavia.

Incumbents
President: 
until 1 June: Dobrica Ćosić
1 June-25 June: Miloš Radulović
starting 25 June: Zoran Lilić

Events
3 January – The Socialist Party of Serbia becomes the largest party when the second round of the Yugoslavian 1992–1993 parliamentary election is held.
FK Partizan wins the Yugoslavian men's national soccer championship.

Births
15 March – Aleksandra Krunić, Russian-Serbian tennis player

References

External links